Asherville may refer to:

Asherville, Indiana, an unincorporated community
Asherville, Kansas, an unincorporated community
Asherville, Missouri, an unincorporated community
Asherville, Durban, a residential area in Durban, South Africa